The Kalka–Shimla Railway is a  narrow-gauge railway in North India which traverses a mostly mountainous route from Kalka to Shimla. It is known for dramatic views of the hills and surrounding villages. The railway was built under the direction of Herbert Septimus Harington between 1898 and 1903 to connect Shimla, the summer capital of India during the British Raj, with the rest of the Indian rail system.

Its early locomotives were manufactured by Sharp, Stewart and Company. Larger locomotives were introduced, which were manufactured by the Hunslet Engine Company. Diesel and diesel-hydraulic locomotives began operation in 1955 and 1970, respectively.

On 8 July 2008, UNESCO added the Kalka–Shimla Railway to the mountain railways of India World Heritage Site.

History

The idea of connecting Shimla by rail was first raised by a correspondent to the Delhi gazette in November 1847.

Shimla became the summer capital of British India in 1864, and was the headquarters of the Indian army. This meant that twice a year it was necessary to transfer the entire government between Calcutta and Shimla by horse and ox drawn carts.

In 1891 the  broad gauge Delhi–Kalka line opened, which made the construction of a branch line up to Shimla feasible.

The earliest survey was made in 1884 followed by another survey in 1885. Based on these two surveys, a project report was submitted in 1887 to the government of British India. Fresh surveys were again made in 1895 from Kalka to Solan with a view to determine whether a 1 in 12 rack or 1 in 25 adhesion line should be chosen. After much debate an adhesion line was chosen in preference to a rack system.

Construction of the Kalka–Shimla Railway on  narrow-gauge tracks was begun by the privately funded Delhi-Ambala-Kalka Railway Company following the signing of a contract between the secretary of state and the company on 29 June 1898. The contract specified that the line would be built without any financial aid or guarantee from the government. The government however provided the land free of charge to the company. The estimated cost of 8,678,500 rupees doubled by the time the line was opened. The Chief Engineer of the project was Herbert Septimus Harington.

The  line opened for traffic on 9 November 1903 and was dedicated by Viceroy Lord Curzon.
This line was further extended from Shimla to Shimla Goods (which had once housed the bullock cart office) on 27 June 1909 making it .

The Indian Army were sceptical  about the two feet gauge chosen for the line and requested that a wider standard gauge be used for mountain and light strategic railways. Eventually the government agreed that the gauge was too narrow for was essentially a capital city and for military purposes. Some sources however state the regauging wasn't undertaken until 1905.

In 1905 the company took delivery of a 10-ton Cowans Sheldon travelling crane to assist with lifting rolling stock back onto the tracks after accidents and for general track maintenance.

Due to the high capital and maintenance costs and difficult working conditions, the railway was allowed to charge higher fares than on other lines. Nevertheless, the company had spent 16,525,000 rupees by 1904 with no sign of the line becoming  profitable, which lead to it being purchased by the government on 1 January 1906 for 17,107,748 rupees.

Once it came under the control of the government the line was originally managed as an independent unit from the North West Railway office in Lahore until 1926, when it was transferred to Delhi Division. Since July 1987, the line has been managed by the Ambala Division from Ambala Cantt.

In 2007, the Himachal Pradesh government declared the railway a heritage property. For about a week, beginning on 11 September 2007, a UNESCO team visited the railway to inspect it for possible selection as a World Heritage Site. On 8 July 2008, it became part of the mountain railways of India World Heritage Site with the Darjeeling Himalayan and Nilgiri Mountain Railways.

Technical details
The track has 20 picturesque stations, 103 tunnels, 912 curves, 969 bridges and 3% slope (1:33 gradient). The 1,143.61 m tunnel  at Barog immediately before the Barog station is longest, a 60 ft (18.29 m) bridge is the longest and the sharpest curve has a 123 ft (38 m) radius of curvature. The railway line originally used  rail, which was later replaced with  rail. The train has an average speed of 25–30 km/hr but the railcar is almost 50–60 km/hr. Both the train and railcar are equipped with vistadomes.

The temperature range and annual rainfall are 0–45 °C and 200–250 cm, respectively.

Operators
The KSR and its assets, including the stations, line and vehicles, belong to the government of India under the Ministry of Railways. The Northern Railway handles day-to-day maintenance and management, and several programs, divisions and departments of Indian Railways are responsible for repairs.

Route

Stations

The alignment of the railway route from south to north, along the NH-5 on highway's western side till north of Jabli (Koti) and then on eastern side, is as follows.

Bridges and viaducts

The railway has 988 bridges and viaducts and a ruling gradient of 1 in 33, or three percent. It has 917 curves, and the sharpest is 48 degrees (a radius of ).

The most architecturally complex bridge is No. 226 which spans a deep valley which required that it had to be constructed in five stages with each level having its own stone arched tier.

Tunnels

One hundred seven tunnels were originally built, but as a result of landslides only 102 remain in use.

Rolling stock

The first locomotives were two class-B 0-4-0STs from the Darjeeling Himalayan Railway. These were built as -gauge engines, but were converted to -gauge in 1901. They were not large enough (they were sold in 1908), and were followed in 1902 by 10 slightly larger engines with a 0-4-2T wheel arrangement. The locomotives weighed  each, and had  driving wheels and  cylinders. Later classified as B-class by the North Western State Railway, they were manufactured by the British Sharp, Stewart and Company.

Thirty larger 2-6-2T locomotives, with slight variations, were introduced between 1904 and 1910. Later classed K and K2 by the North Western State Railway, they handled most of the rail traffic during the steam era. A pair of Kitson-Meyer 2-6-2+2-6-2 articulated locomotives, classed TD, were supplied in 1928. However, they quickly fell into disfavour because it often took all day for enough freight to be assembled to justify operating a goods train hauled by one of these locomotives. Shippers looking for faster service began turning to road transport. Regular steam-locomotive operation ended in 1971.

The railway's first diesel locomotives, class ZDM-1 manufactured by Arnold Jung Lokomotivfabrik (articulated with two prime movers), began operating in 1955; they were regauged, reclassified as NDM-1 and used on the Matheran Hill Railway during the 1970s. In the 1960s, class ZDM-2 locomotives from Maschinenbau Kiel (MaK) was introduced; they were later transferred to other lines.

The KSR currently operates with class ZDM-3 diesel-hydraulic locomotives, built between 1970 and 1982 by Chittaranjan Locomotive Works with a single-cab road-switcher body. Six locomotives of that class were built in 2008 and 2009 by the Central Railway Loco Workshop in Parel, with updated components and a dual-cab body providing better track vision.

The railway opened with conventional four-wheel and bogie coaches. Their tare weight meant that only four bogie coaches could be hauled by the 2-6-2T locomotives. In a 1908 effort to increase capacity, the coach stock was rebuilt as  bogie coaches with steel frames and bodies. To further save weight, the roofs were made of aluminium. The weight savings meant that the locomotives could now haul six of the larger coaches. This was an early example of the use of aluminium in coach construction to reduce tare weight.

Goods rolling stock was constructed on a common  pressed-steel underframe.

During the winter months snow cutters are attached to the engine to clear the snow from the track.

Trains

 Shivalik Deluxe Express: Ten coaches, with chair cars and meal service
 Kalka Shimla Express: First and second class and unreserved seating
 Himalayan Queen: Connects at Kalka with the express mail of the same name and the Kalka Shatabdi Express to Delhi.
 Kalka Shimla Passenger: First and second class and unreserved seating
 Rail Motor: First-class railbus with a glass roof and a front view
 Shivalik Queen: Ten-carriage luxury fleet. Each carriage accommodates up to eight people and has two toilets, wall-to-wall carpeting and large windows. Available through IRCTC's Chandigarh office.

In Popular Culture

BBC Four televised Indian Hill Railways, a series of three programmes which featured the KSR in its third episode, in February 2010; the first two episodes covered the Darjeeling Himalayan Railway and Nilgiri Mountain Railway. The episodes, directed by Tarun Bhartiya, Hugo Smith and Nick Mattingly respectively, were produced by Gerry Troyna. Indian Hill Railways won a Royal Television Society award in June 2010. The KSR also featured in the Punjab episode of CNN's Anthony Bourdain: Parts Unknown.

In 2018, the KSR was featured in an episode of the BBC Two programme Great Indian Railway Journeys.

See also 
 Mountain railways of India
 Rail transport in India
 Tourism in India

References

Notes

Bibliography

External links

http://www.kalkashimlarailway.in/ksr/
 Himachal Pradesh
 Kalka–Shimla Toy Train
 Which Train is Best
 Kalka–Shimla railway
 Article in The Tribune
https://www.thehindu.com/life-and-style/travel/tracking-tales/article24752062.ece
 International Working Steam https://web.archive.org/web/20070609212632/http://www.steam.dial.pipex.com/internat.htm
 Information about all 18 railway stations

2 ft 6 in gauge railways in India
1903 establishments in India
Mountain railways in India
Panchkula
Rail transport in Haryana
Rail transport in Himachal Pradesh
Railway lines opened in 1903
Shimla
Tourist attractions in Haryana
Tourist attractions in Himachal Pradesh
Tourist attractions in Shimla
Transport in Kalka
Transport in Shimla
World Heritage Sites in India
British-era buildings in Himachal Pradesh